Nedunalvaadai is a 2019 Tamil language drama film written and directed by debutant director Selvakannan and produced by B-Star Productions. Inspired by the poem written by Nakkeerar in Sangam literature, the film, as the title suggest, is about the pain of separation — of a man and woman, and a grandfather and his grandson. The movie was a sleeper hit.

This film features Poo Ramu and newcomers Elvis Alexander and Anjali Nair.

Plot 
Chellaiah is a simple farmer. He cares so much for the family. He has a son named Kombaiah and a daughter named Pechiamma, who elopes to marry the love of her life, but he is a drunkard and does not care about his family. Unfortunately, Pechiamma left her husband, and she faces challenges to carry on with living with a son named Elango, as well as a daughter, so she returns to her father. Chellaiah, though unhappy about her act of eloping, takes her family in and starts to support them. However, Kombaiah does not like this. Chellaiah loves and supports his daughter's family and takes care of the education of the grandchildren. Elango, while in his study days, falls for a girl in the village named Amudha. Chellaiah advises Elango about how important taking care of the family is and what his responsibilities are. He warns him about the effects of falling in love at this age while he has to be responsible and supportive to the family. Elango is left trying to balance family and love.

Cast 
 Poo Ramu as Karuvathevar alias Chellaiah  
 Elvis Alexander as Elango 
 Anjali Nair as Amudha
 Ajay Natraj as Maruthapandi 
 Mime Gopi as Kombiah 
 Aindhu Kovilan as Nambithevar
 Senthi Kumari as Pechiamma

Production

Development 
The director of the film Selvakannan is an alumnus of Sankar Polytechnic College, Sankar Nagar, Tirunelveli. Nedunalvaadai is the crowd funded Tamil Film. It's been jointly produced by 50 of his college mates joined together to fund and produce this movie. It all started when one of Selvakannan's friends learned that the latter is struggling to get a producer for his directorial venture. He connected all the classmates through WhatsApp group and finally the film happened. “The first guy through the wall always gets bloody,” says director Selvakannan. Having worked as an assistant to filmmakers Rajesh Selva, Saamy and Gandhi Krishna, Selvakannan decided to take the plunge into direction sometime in 2014. However, none of the producers he met was willing to fund the project. “It’s difficult to convince producers with a slightly offbeat film. Had it not been a Karthik Subbaraj, I don’t think producers would’ve encouraged short filmmakers,” he says.

Cast and crew 
While the film mostly stars newcomers, Selva hired Kaviperarasu Vairamuthu to pen the lyrics. "Vairamuthu sir and editor Kasi Viswanathan are the only two celebrities in the film," he laughs, "I've assisted Vairamuthu sir in his office and have known him for a long time. He didn't charge us a penny for writing the lyrics. One of the songs he has written for us – Karuvatheva Un Kannellam Kanneera – will be a highlight; he was inspired by his own grandfather while penning it". Theater personality Poo Ramu, who got critical acclaim for his performance in Poo, will be seen as the central character of an aged farmer.

Director Selvakannan decided to make Nedunalvaadai, his sole focus was on narrating an impactful story, which will win the appreciation of critics and audience alike. The director says, "There have been many films in the industry that spoke at length about the relationship between a mother and her child and a father and his child. But, not many have delved into the bond a grandchild shares with his/her grandparents. My film revolves around a 70-year-old man (played by Poo Ramu) and his grandson."

Any well-made film, which has a native subject is lapped up by Tamil audiences, Kizhakku Cheemayile, Thenmerku Paruvakaatru to name a few. Nedunalvaadai is one such intense story based on people who still live in Tirunelveli. Ramu has lived in the character of a 70-year-old innocent farmer. Mime Gopi character has shades of grey, Senthikumari are in the supporting cast and several newcomers cast in the film.

Filming 
The film is set against the backdrop of Tirunelveli. The shooting of the film took place around the village surrounding Vasudevanallur and the town Puliangudi. Selvakannan says,"It's been more than 17 years since we all studied together in Tirunelveli, but we make it a point to meet every year. We've always wanted to do something to make our polytechnic college proud. So, we decided to make a film on human emotions and showcase our town in a new light. Though many films have been based in Tirunelveli, we felt none portrayed its true essence. So, my friends funded this venture. This is a festival film and I'm hopeful of it bagging a National Award".

The confidence Selvakannan has in his debut directorial venture reflects in his voice when he talks “There have been many action films that were set in Tirunelveli, but I don’t think any Tamil film has explored its nativity and way of life. My film is based in Tirunelveli and I’ve shot it entirely there. Since I’m also from that place, it became easier for me”.

What's interesting about the film is that it tells the story from a female perspective, which is a rarity in Tamil cinema. Echoing the same, Selvakannan says that the female character is central theme of the film. Through his film, Selvakannan wanted to question the representation of women in mainstream cinema, “People howl and whistle to scenes that are deeply sexist. It’s easy for men to express their emotions post break-up. But a woman has to go through a lot, internally. These are some of the things I looked into before writing.” Smaller films continue to bear the brunt when it comes to the availability of screens. However, Selvakannan believes that the scenario today is much better than what it was when he started out. “There’s an acceptance for a film like Merku Thodarchi Malai, which is very encouraging for filmmakers like me.”

Selvakannan says, "The movie deals with two issues.  Unlike male offspring who has the right to inherit property, the daughters in the family are not given equal rights and recognition. Secondly, the women are always portrayed in a bad manner and blamed for love failures. It is not so.  I have reasoned out their side of reality in the film".

Post-production 
Kasi Viswanathan has handled the editing. Selvakannan approached him for maintaining the required unity of form, rhythm and brooding quality that enhanced the director's vision to fashion a realistic film. “I was clear that my film would not have elements that are not related to the story. So, I was keen to get Kasi Viswanathan on board because I loved the kind of editing he’s done in films like Thenmerku Paruvakaatru and Dharma Durai (2016 film)”. The director recognized the importance of sound and he wanted it to be livelier and realistic. He met the sound designer Pratap who worked in most popular films like Visaranai, Kaala, Vada Chennai and Chekka Chivantha Vaanam and many others. The sound mixer A. M. Rahamathullah is also on board who worked in most popular films like Jigarthanda, Soodhu Kavvum, Irudhi Suttru, Premam, Aval and many others.

Soundtrack
All the songs are penned by Vairamuthu.  Jose Franklin is the music director.

Marketing 
The film's teaser was released by the three directors in 2018: Ram Kumar (Raatchasan), Premkumar (96) and Lenin Bharathi (Merku Thodarchi Malai) on Dec 31, 2018.

Critical response 
Srivatsan of The Hindu wrote, "A strong sense of rootedness prevails over Selvakannan’s crowdfunded movie". India Today gave 3.5 out of 5 stars for Nedunalvaadai and wrote, "Debutant director Selvakannan gifts a pleasant surprise With the brilliant performance of Poo Ramu as an ageing farmer and the engaging writing of Selvakannan, Nedunalavadai, starring many newcomers, is definitely a surprise this month. Watch the film for its story and performances." The Times Of India gave the film 3 out of 5 and wrote, "Despite a few shortcomings, the film will work for those who love rural dramas which have ample dose of family bonding and relationships." New Indian Express said, "Superlative performances elevate this rural drama".

References

External links 

2010s Tamil-language films
Tamil-language literature
2019 films
Films shot in Tamil Nadu
Indian drama films